Aetorrachi (before 1957: Βάλακα - Valaka) is a settlement and a community in the municipal unit of Vouprasia, Elis Greece. It is located in the hills of northern Elis, 3 km east of Borsi, 14 km southeast of Varda and 30 km north of Pyrgos. It is close to the northern shore of the Pineios reservoir, and south of the Movri hills. Its population in 2001 was 92 for the village, and 224 for the community, which includes the village Dafni.

History

The village was founded during the Ottoman Era and was known as Valaka (Greek: Βάλακα), named after the Turkish chief Valak Agaş. After the Greek War of Independence of 1821, the Ottoman rule came to an end, and the Turks fled the area.

Aetorrachi became a community, together with the neighboring village of Kompothekra (which was renamed to Dafni in 1955). Aetorrachi was renamed in 1957 to Aetorrachi. In 1997, under the Kapodistrias Law, the area became a municipal district of the municipality of Vouprasia.

Population

External links
 Aetorrachi on GTP Travel Pages

See also

List of settlements in Elis

References

Vouprasia
Populated places in Elis